"The Cha-Cha-Cha" is a song released in 1962 by Bobby Rydell.

Background
The song tells of the singer's desire to have his "baby" dance the Cha-Cha-Cha, while bemoaning the dance trends of the day (directly referencing the Twist, Wah-Watusi, Hully-Gully, Locomotion and Mashed Potatoes).

Chart performance
The song spent 11 weeks on the Billboard Hot 100 chart, peaking at No. 10 on November 17, 1962, while reaching No. 1 in Hong Kong, No. 2 in Australia, and No. 11 on Canada's CHUM Hit Parade.

References

1962 songs
1962 singles
Bobby Rydell songs
Cameo Records singles
Songs written by Dave Appell
Songs with lyrics by Kal Mann